Oily to Bed, Oily to Rise is a 1939 short subject directed by Jules White starring American slapstick comedy team The Three Stooges (Moe Howard, Larry Fine and Curly Howard). It is the 42nd entry in the series released by Columbia Pictures starring the comedians, who released 190 shorts for the studio between 1934 and 1959.

Plot
The Stooges are three hapless tramps. After nearly destroying a farmer's (Richard Fiske) pile of firewood, and destroying some of his equipment, they hit the road on foot. Curly wishes they had a car after they stop for a break. By accident they think they've found a car for free and take it. After driving around for a bit, and in their distraction nearly having a few collisions, the boys come to the assistance of the farm Widow Jenkins (Eva McKenzie) and her three daughters. Just as Curly had wished, she graciously gives them a huge meal and in return they offer to fix her broken outdoor water pump.

As the Stooges attempt to fix the pump, they discover oil hidden under the farm when the pump turns into an oil geyser, staining their clothes and spewing Curly high in the air. They are happy for the lady and her beautiful daughters, until she regretfully tells them she had just sold the farm. The Stooges realize she was cheated out of her land by a trio of swindlers (Dick Curtis, Eddie Laughton, James Craig). After a hair-raising road chase with the swindlers, they manage to retrieve the deed to the land before it is recorded at the court house, and are allowed to marry the now wealthy Widow Jenkins' daughters.

Production notes
Oily to Bed, Oily to Rise was filmed on March 16–20, 1939. The film's title is a parody of Benjamin Franklin's, "early to bed, early to rise, makes a man healthy, wealthy and wise."

Towards the end of the film, Moe tells Curly to wish for quintuplets and Curly responds that honeymooning in Canada with their new found loves is how to make the wish come true, a reference to the Dionne quintuplets.

The studio crew can be heard laughing when Curly accidentally hits his head on Widow Jenkins' kitchen door while trumpeting and singing "A-Pumping We Will Go."

The shot of Curly riding the oil gusher up into the sky would be reused in Oil's Well That Ends Well.

Moe's injury
Moe Howard recalled in his autobiography that he received a glob of goo (representing oil) directly under his eyelids during shooting:

Moe would have a similar ordeal while filming 1946's The Three Troubledoers, when chunks of black soot became lodged under his eyelids.

References

External links 
 
 

1939 films
Columbia Pictures short films
1939 comedy films
The Three Stooges films
American black-and-white films
Films directed by Jules White
American slapstick comedy films
Works about petroleum
1930s English-language films
1930s American films